Kelly Moore (born January 31, 1959) is the driver with the all-time most wins in the NASCAR Grand National Division, Busch East Series and the driver of the #47 NAPA Chevy. He is the father of NASCAR driver Ryan Moore.

Racing career 
Moore started with the NASCAR Grand National Division, Busch East Series when the series started in 1987. He was the 1995 champion and is the all-time leader in starts, wins, poles, poles in a season, money, top 5 and top 10 finishes.

Moore also ran some Busch East-Busch Series companion events during much of his career, competing in NASCAR's #2 series. In races spanning from 1986 to 1999, Moore earned five top-ten finishes, bested by a runner-up in 1988 at Oxford Plains Speedway.

Personal life
Kelly Moore lives in Scarborough, Maine with his wife, Roxanne and two children, Sarah and Ryan.

Motorsports career results

NASCAR
(key) (Bold – Pole position awarded by qualifying time. Italics – Pole position earned by points standings or practice time. * – Most laps led.)

Busch Series

References

External links

Living people
1959 births
People from Scarborough, Maine
Racing drivers from Maine
NASCAR drivers